The 2000 UAB Blazers football team represented the University of Alabama at Birmingham (UAB) in the college football season of 2000, and was the tenth team fielded by the school. The Blazers' head coach was Watson Brown, who entered his sixth season as UAB's head coach. They played their home games at Legion Field in Birmingham, Alabama, and competed as a member of Conference USA. The Blazers finished their fifth season at the I-A level, and their second affiliated with a conference with a record of 7–4 (3–4 C-USA).

Schedule

References

UAB
UAB Blazers football seasons
UAB Blazers football